José Luis Flores Hernández (born 7 January 1950) is a Mexican economist and politician affiliated with the Institutional Revolutionary Party. He served as a Deputy of the LVII and LIX Legislatures representing Puebla.

References

1950 births
Living people
People from Puebla
Mexican economists
Institutional Revolutionary Party politicians
National Autonomous University of Mexico alumni
Academic staff of the National Autonomous University of Mexico
20th-century Mexican politicians
21st-century Mexican politicians
Deputies of the LIX Legislature of Mexico
Members of the Chamber of Deputies (Mexico) for Puebla